Troy Costa (born 1975) is an Indian fashion designer based in Mumbai who owns the Troy Costa menswear label. Known as the man who suits up India's rich and powerful, Troy launched his bespoke menswear fashion label 'Troy Costa Designs' in 2008 after the runaway success of his shows at the 'Dubai Fashion Week' and the 'Lakme Fashion Week'. His signature style of sharp lines and understated chic has propelled him to become couturier to some of the best-known names in India such as film stars Hrithik Roshan, Anil Kapoor, Saif Ali Khan Pataudi and in 2014 he was hired to design a new look for Indian Prime Minister, Narendra Modi

Early life 
Born and brought up in Bombay (now Mumbai), Costa grew up in a Catholic family, his father is Goan, while his mother is Portuguese.

Career 
He started his career in 2003, designing both men and women's wear and even showcased 'Helen-of-Troy' a women's line at Dubai Fashion Week in 2010  though gradually he shifted focus to menswear. He opened his flagship store in 2011 in Khar West in Mumbai. Over the years, he has designed clothes for 35 Bollywood films, Bollywood actors including Hrithik Roshan,  Aamir Khan, Shahid Kapoor, Saif Ali Khan, Anil Kapoor, Farhan Akhtar, Ayushmann Khurrana and Vir Das, besides various sports and business personalities.

Between 2008 and 2011, the Troy Costa label menswear collections were curated for a number of fashion shows across India and the Middle East. Theme's like 'Man in the Mirror' and 'Sports Couture' at the Dubai International Fashion Week and 'Una Dia En Habana' at the Lakme Fashion Week graced the catwalks with 21st century, avant-garde flamboyant creations that brought in the metrosexual, androgynous unisex look for men's clothing The Ku De Ta collection at the Van Heusen India Men's Week, Spring Summer 2010 collection underpinned Troy's signature sharp silhouettes and subtle glamour balanced with the right choice of fabrics creating a niche for this up and coming designer and winning accolades and rave reviews all around.

With Troy Costa's The Great Gatsby Collection that showcased his Winter 2013 ensemble at Lakme Fashion Week 2013 he introduced a line of formal coats and suits paired with luxury cotton jeans and formal plain shirts with his interpretation of the decadence, idealism and quixotic charm that defined the time At the 2013 autumn-winter Lakme Fashion Week, he received acclaim for his menswear. In 2014, the newly appointed PM, Narendra Modi appointed Costa for wardrobe change, ahead of PM's first important overseas visit, to the BRICS summit in Brazil and subsequent US visit.

Recently, he won an award from Hindustan Times 'Mumbai's Most Stylish 2015'.

References

External links
 

Indian male fashion designers
1975 births
Living people
Artists from Mumbai
Goan Catholics
Indian people of Portuguese descent
Indian costume designers